Peter Tercyak (born December 27, 1954) is an American politician who has served in the Connecticut House of Representatives from the 26th district since 2003.

References

1954 births
Living people
Politicians from Waterville, Maine
Democratic Party members of the Connecticut House of Representatives
21st-century American politicians